Shadow: Dead Riot is a 2006 horror film directed by Derek Wan and starring Tony Todd and Carla Greene.

Plot 
20 years earlier, Shadow who was a satanic serial killer faced execution for the crimes he committed at Ellis Glen penitentiary. However something goes wrong, and soon a riot ensues in the prison. For whatever reason, the guards after killing all the prisoners, to contain the riot ; agree to not only bury them under the prison, but also cover up the entire situation.  In the present day, Solitaire is committed to the prison, now rechristened as a Rehab center, for various crimes including street fighting and the like. Unfortunately she doesn't get a warm welcome into the community, and is forced to fight nearly every other female prisoner except for Emily, a pregnant cell mate of hers. Soon she's forced into solitary confinement, and within there she accidentally makes contact with Shadow's disturbed spirit.  Prior to this, Shadow and Solitaire encountered each other, when Solitaire was a little girl, as Shadow desired to sacrifice her in a satanic ritual. As a result of his death however, Shadow never managed to do so.  Now as Shadow realizes that Solitaire is not only alive but also within the prison,  he gathers up an army of the demonic zombie, who were the prisoners killed 20 years ago, to storm the prison, kill everyone else, and bring Solitaire to him.

Cast
 Tony Todd as "Shadow"
 Carla Greene as "Solitaire"
 Nina Hodoruk as Warden Danvers
 Michael Quinlan as Dr. Swann
 Cat Miller as Emily "Preggers"
 Andrea Langi as Elsa Thorne
 Tatianna Butler as "Mondo"
 William Newman as Male Guard

References

External links

http://www.answers.com/topic/shadow-dead-riot
http://movies.tvguide.com/shadow-dead-riot/review/279117 

2006 films
American zombie films
2006 horror films
2000s action horror films
American action horror films
Women in prison films
Direct-to-video horror films
2000s English-language films
2000s American films